Saw Myat Lay was the chief queen consort of King Thado Minsaw of Prome. Prior, she had been the chief wife of Viceroy Mingyi Swa of Prome since  1450s.

Brief
Saw Myat Lay was the second child of Princess Saw Min Phyu and Saw Shwe Khet, who was governor of Prome (r. 1417–1422; 1442–1446) and Tharrawaddy (r. 1422–1427; 1446–1460). Likely born in the late 1430s, the princess was a granddaughter of the famous crown prince Minye Kyawswa of Ava, and a great granddaughter of King Minkhaung I of Ava from her mother's side, and a descendant of King Kyawswa of Pagan from both sides. She had two full siblings: Gov. Minye Kyawswa I of Kalay and Myat Hpone Pyo; and three half-siblings.

Though the royal chronicles do not state her place of birth, Myat Lay was raised in Prome where her father was governor between 1442 and 1446, and in Tharrawaddy, the southernmost district of Prome to which her father was reassigned, from 1446 onwards until her marriage. She returned to Prome, perhaps in the 1450s, when she was married to Viceroy Mingyi Swa, the second son of then King Narapati I of Ava. She became the vicereine of Prome, and had 11 children with Swa.

Myat Lay became the chief queen consort in 1482. That year, Viceroy Swa died, and his younger brother Gov.  Thado Minsaw of Tharrawaddy seized the viceroyalty of Prome, and declared Prome's independence from Ava. In the process, he also raised his sister-in-law Myat Lay as his chief queen. Thado Minsaw's rebellion was successful; Prome became an independent state with territories that included Tharrawaddy in the south and Myede in the north. It was the last mention of Myat Lay in the chronicles. Thado Minsaw lived until 1526 but it is unclear if Myat Lay survived him until then.

Family
Myat Lay and her first husband Swa had 11 children (four sons and seven daughters). She did not have any children with her second husband.

Ancestry
The following is the queen's ancestry according to the royal chronicles.

Notes

References

Bibliography

15th-century Burmese women
Chief queens consort of Prome